The Langkawi Cable Car, also known as Langkawi SkyCab, is a gondola lift and one of the major attractions in Langkawi Island, Kedah, Malaysia. It provides an aerial link from the Oriental Village at Teluk Burau to the peak of Gunung Machinchang, which is also the location of the Langkawi Sky Bridge. It was officially opened in 2003.

Langkawi Cable Car is located just north of Telaga Harbour, Pantai Kok, with the entrance within 'Oriental Village' at the foothill of the Mat Chincang mountain range. It is located to the north-west of the Langkawi International Airport, on the west coast of the main island of Langkawi. It is approximate 30 minutes drive from Kuah town and 15 minutes drive from Langkawi International Airport.

Construction and design

The Langkawi cable car project was first mooted in 1999 by the then Prime Minister Mahathir Mohamad when he flew over Gunung Machinchang in a helicopter during his visit to Langkawi. The project was a joint venture by Doppelmayr of Austria and a local company.

After a survey of the mountain conducted in May 2000, the construction of Langkawi Cable Car began in April 2001. There are three stations for the cable car; the Top Station is located at the peak of Gunung Machinchang which is the second-highest peak of Langkawi. In the middle is an "angle station" where the gondolas make a 45-degree turn to reach the Top Station. As there is no road to the top due to the steepness of Gunung Machinchang, all the structural components needed to be lifted to top with helicopters in combination with an auxiliary working cable and then assembled on site.

When there are strong winds, the cable car operation would be put on hold. There are also 4 bottom glass gondolas which sit 6 passengers and 2 VIP gondolas each with 3 leather seats.

The Langkawi cable car was completed in August 2002 at a cost of RM 46 million. The soft launch for the cable car was held for six days in October 2002 which was well-received, it then opened to the general public on 1 November 2002. It was officially opened in 2003.

Stations

Base Station
The Base Station is located at the Oriental Village, a theme shopping centre housing 30 individually designed buildings showcasing Malaysian and Oriental architecture. From this base, visitors can take the ride to the Machincang range via the Langkawi Cable Car on gondolas. The SkyDome, a 360-degree panorama screen dome theatre located at the Base Station, offers visitors free viewing while they are waiting for their ride on the Cable Car. The gondolas arrive at the station around every 30 seconds.  The cable car may be closed 2 days a month in a predetermined maintenance schedule, and in bad weather condition.

Middle Station

An intermediate Cable Car station on the eastern ridges provides access to the eastern cliffs with its 3 vertical chimneys and the 360-degree views.  The gondolas make a 45-degree turn at this "angle station" to reach the top.

Top Station

There are two circular viewing platforms at the top of Gunung Machinchang, which are both a short walk up the stairs from the top station and offer 360° views.

Features

The ride affords a view of the surrounding forest, the Telaga Tujuh (Seven Wells) waterfall, as well as the sea. From the top station, there is an inclinator called SkyGlide and a mountain route that allow access to the Langkawi Sky Bridge. There are two viewing platforms at the top of Machincang mountain, and other amenities.

There is a  walking trail, the SkyTrail, through the forest from the top station that goes down to the middle station, and then the Seven Wells (Telaga Tujuh) waterfall, although walking unguided through the trail is not advisable as the trail is not well-maintained and there is a risk of getting lost.  Pre-arrangement with a naturalist guide is necessary. There are some safety issues raised by some of the tourists.

Technical data
 Horizontal distance: 2079 m
 Vertical rise: 680 m
 Inclined distance: 2158 m
 Haul rope diameter: 50 mm
 Bull wheel diameter: 6.10 m
 Passenger per gondola: 6 persons
 Design speed: 5 m/s
 Operating speed: 3 m/s
 Turn around trip time: 28 minute
 Hourly capacity: 700 passengers/hour
 Number of stations: 3
 Number of in-line towers: 2
 Height of Tower 1: 38 m
 Height of Tower 2: 70 m
 Longest free span: 919.5 m (between Tower 2 & Middle station)
 Steepest gradient: 42 degrees
 Construction period: 16 months (April 2001 - August 2002)
 Testing & Commissioning period: 3 months (August 2002 - October 2002)

See also
 Awana Skyway - Aerial tramway type
 Genting Skyway - Gondola lift type
 Penang Hill Railway - Funicular type
 Rail transport in Malaysia

Key points
  Burau Bay Resort station
  Gunung Machinchang station ( above sea level)

References

External links

Langkawi Cable Car @ Panorama Langkawi website
Tourism Malaysia - Langkawi Cable Car
Photos at panoramio.com
Langkawi Cable Car 

2002 establishments in Malaysia
Gondola lifts in Malaysia
Langkawi
Transport in Kedah
Buildings and structures in Kedah
Tourist attractions in Kedah